The 1985–86 New York Rangers season was the franchise's 60th season. The highlight of the season was participating in the Prince of Wales Conference Finals.

Regular season

Final standings

Schedule and results

|- align="center" bgcolor="#CCFFCC"
| 1 || 10 || Washington Capitals || 4 - 2 || 1-0-0
|- align="center" bgcolor="#FFBBBB"
| 2 || 12 || @ Hartford Whalers || 8 - 2 || 1-1-0
|- align="center" bgcolor="#FFBBBB"
| 3 || 13 || New Jersey Devils || 3 - 2 OT || 1-2-0
|- align="center" bgcolor="#FFBBBB"
| 4 || 16 || @ Los Angeles Kings || 4 - 3 || 1-3-0
|- align="center" bgcolor="#FFBBBB"
| 5 || 19 || @ New York Islanders || 5 - 4 || 1-4-0
|- align="center" bgcolor="#CCFFCC"
| 6 || 20 || Vancouver Canucks || 4 - 3 || 2-4-0
|- align="center" bgcolor="#CCFFCC"
| 7 || 23 || New Jersey Devils || 5 - 1 || 3-4-0
|- align="center" bgcolor="#CCFFCC"
| 8 || 25 || Los Angeles Kings || 5 - 0 || 4-4-0
|- align="center" bgcolor="#CCFFCC"
| 9 || 27 || Boston Bruins || 2 - 1 || 5-4-0
|-

|- align="center" bgcolor="#FFBBBB"
| 10 || 2 || @ New Jersey Devils || 6 - 5 OT || 5-5-0
|- align="center" bgcolor="#CCFFCC"
| 11 || 4 || @ Pittsburgh Penguins || 4 - 2 || 6-5-0
|- align="center" bgcolor="#FFBBBB"
| 12 || 6 || Philadelphia Flyers || 5 - 2 || 6-6-0
|- align="center" bgcolor="#CCFFCC"
| 13 || 8 || @ Winnipeg Jets || 7 - 3 || 7-6-0
|- align="center" bgcolor="#FFBBBB"
| 14 || 9 || @ Minnesota North Stars || 4 - 3 OT || 7-7-0
|- align="center" bgcolor="#FFBBBB"
| 15 || 11 || Chicago Black Hawks || 5 - 4 OT || 7-8-0
|- align="center" bgcolor="#CCFFCC"
| 16 || 13 || Montreal Canadiens || 5 - 2 || 8-8-0
|- align="center" bgcolor="white"
| 17 || 16 || @ Montreal Canadiens || 2 - 2 OT || 8-8-1
|- align="center" bgcolor="#FFBBBB"
| 18 || 17 || Edmonton Oilers || 3 - 2 OT || 8-9-1
|- align="center" bgcolor="#CCFFCC"
| 19 || 20 || Toronto Maple Leafs || 7 - 3 || 9-9-1
|- align="center" bgcolor="#CCFFCC"
| 20 || 23 || @ New York Islanders || 5 - 0 || 10-9-1
|- align="center" bgcolor="#FFBBBB"
| 21 || 24 || New York Islanders || 4 - 3 OT || 10-10-1
|- align="center" bgcolor="#FFBBBB"
| 22 || 27 || Calgary Flames || 5 - 2 || 10-11-1
|- align="center" bgcolor="#CCFFCC"
| 23 || 29 || @ Washington Capitals || 5 - 2 || 11-11-1
|- align="center" bgcolor="#FFBBBB"
| 24 || 30 || @ Pittsburgh Penguins || 5 - 4 || 11-12-1
|-

|- align="center" bgcolor="#FFBBBB"
| 25 || 2 || Pittsburgh Penguins || 6 - 0 || 11-13-1
|- align="center" bgcolor="#CCFFCC"
| 26 || 4 || Winnipeg Jets || 7 - 4 || 12-13-1
|- align="center" bgcolor="#FFBBBB"
| 27 || 7 || @ Philadelphia Flyers || 4 - 0 || 12-14-1
|- align="center" bgcolor="#CCFFCC"
| 28 || 8 || Philadelphia Flyers || 3 - 1 || 13-14-1
|- align="center" bgcolor="#CCFFCC"
| 29 || 11 || @ New Jersey Devils || 4 - 2 || 14-14-1
|- align="center" bgcolor="#FFBBBB"
| 30 || 14 || @ Boston Bruins || 4 - 2 || 14-15-1
|- align="center" bgcolor="#FFBBBB"
| 31 || 15 || Pittsburgh Penguins || 5 - 2 || 14-16-1
|- align="center" bgcolor="#FFBBBB"
| 32 || 18 || Buffalo Sabres || 5 - 4 || 14-17-1
|- align="center" bgcolor="white"
| 33 || 20 || New York Islanders || 2 - 2 OT || 14-17-2
|- align="center" bgcolor="#CCFFCC"
| 34 || 21 || @ New York Islanders || 5 - 4 || 15-17-2
|- align="center" bgcolor="#CCFFCC"
| 35 || 23 || Detroit Red Wings || 10 - 2 || 16-17-2
|- align="center" bgcolor="#FFBBBB"
| 36 || 26 || @ Buffalo Sabres || 6 - 1 || 16-18-2
|- align="center" bgcolor="#FFBBBB"
| 37 || 28 || @ Minnesota North Stars || 3 - 1 || 16-19-2
|- align="center" bgcolor="#CCFFCC"
| 38 || 29 || Washington Capitals || 6 - 5 || 17-19-2
|-

|- align="center" bgcolor="#FFBBBB"
| 39 || 1 || @ Washington Capitals || 3 - 0 || 17-20-2
|- align="center" bgcolor="#FFBBBB"
| 40 || 5 || Quebec Nordiques || 5 - 4 || 17-21-2
|- align="center" bgcolor="#CCFFCC"
| 41 || 10 || Montreal Canadiens || 6 - 4 || 18-21-2
|- align="center" bgcolor="white"
| 42 || 12 || St. Louis Blues || 2 - 2 OT || 18-21-3
|- align="center" bgcolor="#CCFFCC"
| 43 || 14 || @ Vancouver Canucks || 2 - 1 || 19-21-3
|- align="center" bgcolor="#CCFFCC"
| 44 || 15 || @ Los Angeles Kings || 4 - 3 || 20-21-3
|- align="center" bgcolor="#CCFFCC"
| 45 || 18 || @ Edmonton Oilers || 5 - 4 || 21-21-3
|- align="center" bgcolor="#FFBBBB"
| 46 || 20 || Hartford Whalers || 5 - 0 || 21-22-3
|- align="center" bgcolor="#CCFFCC"
| 47 || 22 || @ Toronto Maple Leafs || 4 - 2 || 22-22-3
|- align="center" bgcolor="#FFBBBB"
| 48 || 23 || Quebec Nordiques || 4 - 0 || 22-23-3
|- align="center" bgcolor="white"
| 49 || 27 || @ Quebec Nordiques || 6 - 6 OT || 22-23-4
|- align="center" bgcolor="#FFBBBB"
| 50 || 29 || @ Chicago Black Hawks || 5 - 4 || 22-24-4
|- align="center" bgcolor="#FFBBBB"
| 51 || 31 || @ Buffalo Sabres || 5 - 3 || 22-25-4
|-

|- align="center" bgcolor="#CCFFCC"
| 52 || 1 || @ Hartford Whalers || 3 - 1 || 23-25-4
|- align="center" bgcolor="#FFBBBB"
| 53 || 5 || @ St. Louis Blues || 4 - 3 || 23-26-4
|- align="center" bgcolor="#CCFFCC"
| 54 || 8 || @ Boston Bruins || 3 - 2 || 24-26-4
|- align="center" bgcolor="#CCFFCC"
| 55 || 12 || Vancouver Canucks || 5 - 2 || 25-26-4
|- align="center" bgcolor="#CCFFCC"
| 56 || 14 || @ Detroit Red Wings || 7 - 5 || 26-26-4
|- align="center" bgcolor="#CCFFCC"
| 57 || 16 || Detroit Red Wings || 3 - 1 || 27-26-4
|- align="center" bgcolor="#CCFFCC"
| 58 || 20 || St. Louis Blues || 3 - 2 || 28-26-4
|- align="center" bgcolor="#CCFFCC"
| 59 || 24 || Minnesota North Stars || 5 - 1 || 29-26-4
|- align="center" bgcolor="#FFBBBB"
| 60 || 25 || @ Toronto Maple Leafs || 7 - 3 || 29-27-4
|- align="center" bgcolor="#CCFFCC"
| 61 || 27 || Pittsburgh Penguins || 8 - 3 || 30-27-4
|-

|- align="center" bgcolor="#FFBBBB"
| 62 || 1 || @ Washington Capitals || 4 - 0 || 30-28-4
|- align="center" bgcolor="#FFBBBB"
| 63 || 2 || Washington Capitals || 4 - 2 || 30-29-4
|- align="center" bgcolor="#FFBBBB"
| 64 || 5 || @ Winnipeg Jets || 4 - 1 || 30-30-4
|- align="center" bgcolor="#CCFFCC"
| 65 || 6 || @ Calgary Flames || 5 - 2 || 31-30-4
|- align="center" bgcolor="#FFBBBB"
| 66 || 9 || Philadelphia Flyers || 4 - 1 || 31-31-4
|- align="center" bgcolor="#CCFFCC"
| 67 || 11 || @ New Jersey Devils || 6 - 3 || 32-31-4
|- align="center" bgcolor="#FFBBBB"
| 68 || 12 || Calgary Flames || 3 - 2 || 32-32-4
|- align="center" bgcolor="white"
| 69 || 15 || @ Pittsburgh Penguins || 2 - 2 OT || 32-32-5
|- align="center" bgcolor="#CCFFCC"
| 70 || 16 || New York Islanders || 3 - 1 || 33-32-5
|- align="center" bgcolor="#FFBBBB"
| 71 || 18 || @ New York Islanders || 6 - 2 || 33-33-5
|- align="center" bgcolor="#FFBBBB"
| 72 || 22 || @ Philadelphia Flyers || 4 - 2 || 33-34-5
|- align="center" bgcolor="#FFBBBB"
| 73 || 23 || Chicago Black Hawks || 5 - 3 || 33-35-5
|- align="center" bgcolor="#CCFFCC"
| 74 || 25 || @ New Jersey Devils || 5 - 4 || 34-35-5
|- align="center" bgcolor="#CCFFCC"
| 75 || 28 || Edmonton Oilers || 4 - 2 || 35-35-5
|- align="center" bgcolor="#FFBBBB"
| 76 || 29 || @ Philadelphia Flyers || 8 - 2 || 35-36-5
|- align="center" bgcolor="#CCFFCC"
| 77 || 31 || New Jersey Devils || 9 - 0 || 36-36-5
|-

|- align="center" bgcolor="#FFBBBB"
| 78 || 2 || Philadelphia Flyers || 3 - 2 || 36-37-5
|- align="center" bgcolor="white"
| 79 || 5 || @ Washington Capitals || 4 - 4 OT || 36-37-6
|- align="center" bgcolor="#FFBBBB"
| 80 || 6 || Pittsburgh Penguins || 5 - 4 OT || 36-38-6
|-

Playoffs

Key:  Win  Loss

Player statistics
Skaters

Goaltenders

†Denotes player spent time with another team before joining Rangers. Stats reflect time with Rangers only.
‡Traded mid-season. Stats reflect time with Rangers only.

Draft picks
New York's picks at the 1985 NHL Entry Draft in Toronto, Ontario, Canada at the Metro Toronto Convention Centre.

Awards and records
 John Vanbiesbrouck, Vezina Trophy
 John Vanbiesbrouck, goaltender, NHL first team All-Star

References

External links
 Rangers on Hockey Database

New York Rangers seasons
New York Rangers
New York Rangers
New York Rangers
New York Rangers
1980s in Manhattan
Madison Square Garden